Lewy is a surname. Notable people with the surname include:

Alfred J. Lewy, psychiatrist
Bergnart Carl Lewy, Danish chemist
Casimir Lewy, philosopher  
Frederic Lewy, neurologist best known for discovering Lewy bodies
Glen Lewy, National Chair of the Anti-Defamation League
Guenter Lewy, political scientist
Hans Lewy, Mathematician
Israel Lewy, German-Jewish scholar
Robert Ira Lewy, American doctor

See also